Seduction is a 2013 Filipino thriller drama film directed by Peque Gallaga and starring GMA Network's exclusive actors Richard Gutierrez, Solenn Heussaff, and Sarah Lahbati. The film was produced by Regal Films and was released on January 30, 2013.

Cast
Richard Gutierrez as Ram
Solenn Heussaff as Sophia
Sarah Lahbati as Trina
Mark Gil as Fidel
Jay Manalo as Ervin
Yayo Aguila as Dolor
Vangie Labalan as Viring
Al Tantay as Lucas
Shyr Valdez as Yolanda
Jon Orlando as Marcel
Rodjun Cruz

Reception
Although reviews were mostly positive, the film was a Philippine box office bomb.

References 

2013 films
2013 romantic drama films
2010s Tagalog-language films
Regal Entertainment films
Philippine romantic drama films
2010s English-language films
Films directed by Peque Gallaga